Baljit Singh Chadha (born 1951) is a Canadian businessman based in Montreal, Quebec, who is the president and founder of Balcorp Limited which he started in 1976.The company has offices in Montreal, New Delhi and Mumbai. He is a leader of the Sikh community in Canada. Chadha immigrated to Canada in 1973 from India.

His international trading company has also varied interests that include agricultural food products, processed foods, forestry products, and minerals.

Professional life

Chadha graduated from Bombay University with a Bachelor of Science degree. He later obtained an MBA from Concordia University.

He is one of the Directors of the Canada India Business Council (C-IBC), along with a number of other prominent Canadian business people (see https://www.canada-indiabusiness.com)

He was on the Board of Governors of Concordia University and is a major benefactor to the institution. He is currently Emeritus Board Member.

Mr. Chadha’s directorships and memberships extend across many communities in Canada and around the world. Past and current involvement includes: Governor, Montreal Economic Institute; Distinguished Fellow, Asia Pacific Foundation of Canada, Vancouver (www.asiapacific.ca); Patron, Historica-Dominion Institute, Toronto; Director, International Tree Nut Congress, Spain; Advisor on Indo-Canadian affairs to the Office of Montreal Mayor Bourque; Member, Advisory Board of the Indo-Canada Chamber of Commerce, Toronto; Member, Board of Directors, Association des Maisons de Commerce Extérieures du Québec (Quebec Association of Export Trading Houses), Montreal.

Personal life

He is married to Roshi Chadha. The couple lives in Montreal.

She was a member-at-large on McGill University's Board of Governors (BoG) and she also served on the governing body of the Canadian Red Cross

Security Intelligence Review Committee Tenure

In 2003 Chadha was appointed by then-prime minister Jean Chrétien for a five-year term position at the Security Intelligence Review Committee, the body that oversees CSIS, Canada's spy agency, in Ottawa and was, as a condition for his participation in the Committee, also appointed to the Queen's Privy Council for Canada.

He sat on the Security Intelligence Review Committee from 2003 to 2008.

Baljit S. Chadha was one of the members of the spy agency watchdog on September 18, 2006, the Commission of Inquiry into the Actions of Canadian Officials in Relation to Maher Arar led by Justice Dennis O'Connor released its report.

The Committee was chaired by Gary Filmon, P.C., O.M., who had been appointed Chair on June 24, 2005. The other Members were Raymond Speaker, P.C., O.C., Baljit S. Chadha, P.C., Roy Romanow, P.C., O.C., Q.C. and Aldéa Landry, P.C., C.M., Q.C..

References

External links
NRI, Baljit Singh Chadha, Canada's Nut King Entrepreneur - Article

Businesspeople from Montreal
Canadian Sikhs
Indian emigrants to Canada
Members of the King's Privy Council for Canada
1951 births
Living people
Chadh, Baljit
Place of birth missing (living people)
Punjabi people